An integer triangle or integral triangle is a triangle all of whose side lengths are integers.  A rational triangle is one whose side lengths are rational numbers; any rational triangle can be rescaled by the lowest common denominator of the  sides to obtain a similar integer triangle, so there is a close relationship between integer triangles and rational triangles.

Sometimes other definitions of the term rational triangle are used: Carmichael (1914) and Dickson (1920) use the term to mean a Heronian triangle (a triangle with integral or rational side lengths and area);<ref>{{cite book |last=Carmichael |first=R. D. |orig-year=1914 |chapter=Diophantine Analysis |pages= 11–13] |editor=R. D. Carmichael |year=1959 |title=The Theory of Numbers and Diophantine Analysis |url= |publisher=Dover Publications}}</ref> Conway and Guy (1996) define a rational triangle as one with rational sides and rational angles measured in degrees—the only such triangles are rational-sided equilateral triangles.

General properties for an integer triangle

Integer triangles with given perimeter
Any triple of positive integers can serve as the side lengths of an integer triangle as long as it satisfies the triangle inequality: the longest side is shorter than the sum of the other two sides. Each such triple defines an integer triangle that is unique up to congruence. So the number of integer triangles (up to congruence) with perimeter p is the number of partitions of p into three positive parts that satisfy the triangle inequality. This is the integer closest to  when p is even and to  when p is odd.Ross Honsberger, Mathematical Gems III, pp. 39–37 It also means that the number of integer triangles with even numbered perimeters p = 2n is the same as the number of integer triangles with odd numbered perimeters p = 2n − 3.  Thus there is no integer triangle with perimeter 1, 2 or 4, one with perimeter 3, 5, 6 or 8, and two with perimeter 7 or 10. The sequence of the number of integer triangles with perimeter p, starting at p = 1, is:

0, 0, 1, 0, 1, 1, 2, 1, 3, 2, 4, 3, 5, 4, 7, 5, 8, 7, 10, 8 ... 

This is called Alcuin's sequence.

Integer triangles with given largest side
The number of integer triangles (up to congruence) with given largest side c and integer triple (a, b, c) is the number of integer triples such that a + b > c and a ≤ b ≤ c. This is the integer value Ceiling[] * Floor[]. Alternatively, for c even it is the double triangular number ( + 1) and for c odd it is the square . It also means that the number of integer triangles with greatest side c exceeds the number of integer triangles with greatest side c − 2 by c. The sequence of the number of non-congruent integer triangles with largest side c, starting at c = 1, is:
1, 2, 4, 6, 9, 12, 16, 20, 25, 30, 36, 42, 49, 56, 64, 72, 81, 90 ... 

The number of integer triangles (up to congruence) with given largest side c and integer triple (a, b, c) that lie on or within a semicircle of diameter c is the number of integer triples such that a + b > c , a2 + b2 ≤ c2 and a ≤ b ≤ c. This is also the number of integer sided obtuse or right (non-acute) triangles with largest side c. The sequence starting at c = 1, is:
0, 0, 1, 1, 3, 4, 5, 7, 10, 13, 15, 17, 22, 25, 30, 33, 38, 42, 48 ... 

Consequently, the difference between the two above sequences gives the number of acute integer sided triangles (up to congruence) with given largest side c. The sequence starting at c = 1, is:
1, 2, 3, 5, 6, 8, 11, 13, 15, 17, 21, 25, 27, 31, 34, 39, 43, 48, 52 ... 

Area of an integer triangle
By Heron's formula, if T is the area of a triangle whose sides have lengths a, b, and c then

Since all the terms under the radical on the right side of the formula are integers it follows that all integer triangles must have an integer value of 16T2 and T2 will be rational.

Angles of an integer triangle

By the law of cosines, every angle of an integer triangle has a rational cosine.

If the angles of any triangle form an arithmetic progression then one of its angles must be 60°. For integer triangles the remaining angles must also have rational cosines and a method of generating such triangles is given below. However, apart from the trivial case of an equilateral triangle, there are no integer triangles whose angles form either a geometric or harmonic progression. This is because such angles have to be rational angles of the form  with rational  0 <  < 1. But all the angles of integer triangles must have rational cosines and this will occur only when   i.e. the integer triangle is equilateral.

The square of each internal angle bisector of an integer triangle is rational, because the general triangle formula for the internal angle bisector of angle A is  where s is the semiperimeter (and likewise for the other angles' bisectors).

Side split by an altitude

Any altitude dropped from a vertex onto an opposite side or its extension will split that side or its extension into rational lengths.

Medians

Circumradius and inradius

Because the square of the area of an integer triangle is rational, the square of its circumradius is also rational, as is the square of the inradius.

The ratio of the inradius to the circumradius of an integer triangle is rational, equaling  for semiperimeter s and area T.

The product of the inradius and the circumradius of an integer triangle is rational, equaling 

Thus the squared distance between the incenter and the circumcenter of an integer triangle, given by Euler's theorem as R2 − 2Rr, is rational.

Heronian triangles

All Heronian triangles can be placed on a lattice with each vertex at a lattice point.

General formula

A Heronian triangle, also known as a Heron triangle or a Hero triangle, is a triangle with integer sides and integer area.  Every Heronian triangle has sides proportional to

for integers m, n and k subject to the constraints:

The proportionality factor is generally a rational  where q = gcd(a,b,c) reduces the generated Heronian triangle to its primitive and  scales up this primitive to the required size.

Pythagorean triangles

A Pythagorean triangle is right-angled and Heronian. Its three integer sides are known as a Pythagorean triple or Pythagorean triplet or Pythagorean triad.  All Pythagorean triples  with hypotenuse  which are primitive (the sides having no common factor) can be generated by

where m and n are coprime integers and one of them is even with m > n.

This is essentially the generation formula above with  set to 1 and allowing  to range from 2 to infinity.

Pythagorean triangles with integer altitude from the hypotenuse

There are no primitive Pythagorean triangles with integer altitude from the hypotenuse. This is because twice the area equals any base times the corresponding height: 2 times the area thus equals both ab and cd where d is the height from the hypotenuse c. The three side lengths of a primitive triangle are coprime, so d =  is in fully reduced form; since c cannot equal 1 for any primitive Pythagorean triangle, d cannot be an integer.

However, any Pythagorean triangle with legs x, y and hypotenuse z can generate a Pythagorean triangle with an integer altitude, by scaling up the sides by the length of the hypotenuse z. If d is the altitude, then the generated Pythagorean triangle with integer altitude is given by

 

 

 

 

 
for coprime integers m, n with m > n.

Heronian triangles with sides in arithmetic progression

A triangle with integer sides and integer area has sides in arithmetic progression if and only if the sides are (b – d, b, b + d), where

Heronian triangles with one angle equal to twice another

All Heronian triangles with B = 2A are generated by either

with integers k, s, r such that s2 > 3r2, or

,
,
,
,

with integers  such that  and 

No Heronian triangles with B = 2A are isosceles or right triangles because all resulting angle combinations generate angles with non-rational sines, giving a non-rational area or side.

Isosceles Heronian triangles

All isosceles Heronian triangles are decomposable. They are formed by joining two congruent Pythagorean triangles along either of their common legs such that the equal sides of the isosceles triangle are the hypotenuses of the Pythagorean triangles, and the base of the isosceles triangle is twice the other Pythagorean leg. Consequently, every Pythagorean triangle is the building block for two isosceles Heronian triangles since the join can be along either leg.
All pairs of isosceles Heronian triangles are given by rational multiples of

and

for coprime integers u and v with u > v and u + v odd.

Heronian triangles whose perimeter is four times a prime
Yui, P. and Taylor, J. S., "CRUX, Problem 2331, Solution"  Memorial University of Newfoundland (1999): 185-186 It is well known that such a prime  can be uniquely partitioned into integers  and  such that  (see Euler's idoneal numbers). Furthermore, it has been shown that such Heronian triangles are primitive since the smallest side of the triangle has to be equal to the prime that is one quarter of its perimeter.

Consequently, all primitive Heronian triangles whose perimeter is four times a prime can be generated by

for integers  and  such that  is a prime.

Furthermore, the factorization of the area is  where  is prime.

Heronian triangles with rational angle bisectors

If in a Heronian triangle the angle bisector  of the angle , the angle bisector  of the angle  and the angle bisector  of the angle  have a rational relationship with the three sides then not only  but also ,  and  must be Heronian angles. This is also evident if one multiplies:

together. Namely, through this one obtains:

where  denotes the semi-perimeter, and  the area of the triangle.

All Heronian triangles with rational angle bisectors are generated by

where  are such that

where  are arbitrary integers such that
 and  coprime,
 and  coprime.

Heronian triangles with integer inradius and exradii

There are infinitely many decomposable, and infinitely many indecomposable, primitive Heronian (non-Pythagorean) triangles with integer radii for the incircle and each excircle. A family of decomposible ones is given by

and a family of indecomposable ones is given by

Heronian triangles as faces of a tetrahedron

There exist tetrahedra having integer-valued volume and Heron triangles as faces. One example has one edge of 896, the opposite edge of 190, and the other four edges of 1073; two faces have areas of 436800 and the other two have areas of 47120, while the volume is 62092800.

Heronian triangles in a 2D lattice

A 2D lattice is a regular array of isolated points where if any one point is chosen as the Cartesian origin (0, 0), then all the other points are at (x, y) where x and y range over all positive and negative integers. A lattice triangle is any triangle drawn within a 2D lattice such that all vertices lie on lattice points. By Pick's theorem a lattice triangle has a rational area that either is an integer or a half-integer (has a denominator of 2). If the lattice triangle has integer sides then it is Heronian with integer area.

Furthermore, it has been proved that all Heronian triangles can be drawn as lattice triangles. Consequently, an integer triangle is Heronian if and only if it can be drawn as a lattice triangle.

There are infinitely many primitive Heronian (non-Pythagorean) triangles which can be placed on an integer lattice with all vertices, the incenter, and all three excenters at lattice points. Two families of such triangles are the ones with parametrizations given above at #Heronian triangles with integer inradius and exradii.

Integer automedian triangles

An automedian triangle is one whose medians are in the same proportions (in the opposite order) as the sides. If x, y, and z are the three sides of a right triangle, sorted in increasing order by size, and if 2x < z, then z, x + y, and y − x are the three sides of an automedian triangle. For instance, the right triangle with side lengths 5, 12, and 13 can be used in this way to form the smallest non-trivial (i.e., non-equilateral) integer automedian triangle, with side lengths 13, 17, and 7.

Consequently, using Euclid's formula, which generates primitive Pythagorean triangles, it is possible to generate primitive integer automedian triangles as

An important characteristic of the automedian triangle is that the squares of its sides form an arithmetic progression. Specifically,  so 

Integer triangles with specific angle properties

Integer triangles with a rational angle bisector

A triangle family with integer sides  and with rational bisector  of angle A is given by

with integers .

Integer triangles with integer n-sectors of all angles

There exist infinitely many non-similar triangles in which the three sides and the bisectors of each of the three angles are integers.

There exist infinitely many non-similar triangles in which the three sides and the two trisectors of each of the three angles are integers.

However, for n > 3 there exist no triangles in which the three sides and the (n – 1) n-sectors of each of the three angles are integers.

Integer triangles with one angle with a given rational cosine

Some integer triangles with one angle at vertex A having given rational cosine h / k (h < 0 or > 0; k > 0) are given by

where p and q are any coprime positive integers such that p > qk.

Integer triangles with a 60° angle (angles in arithmetic progression)

All integer triangles with a 60° angle have their angles in an arithmetic progression. All such triangles are proportional to:

with coprime integers m, n and 1 ≤ n ≤ m or 3m ≤ n. From here, all primitive solutions can be obtained by dividing a, b, and c by their greatest common divisor.

Integer triangles with a 60° angle can also be generated by

with coprime integers m, n with 0 < n < m (the angle of 60° is opposite to the side of length a). See also Read, Emrys, "On integer-sided triangles containing angles of 120° or 60°", Mathematical Gazette 90, July 2006, 299−305.

More precisely, If , then , otherwise . Two different pairs  and  generate the same triple. Unfortunately the two pairs can both be of gcd = 3, so we can't avoid duplicates by simply skipping that case. Instead, duplicates can be avoided by  going only till . We still need to divide by 3 if gcd = 3. With this additional  constraint all triples can be generated uniquely.

An Eisenstein triple is a set of integers which are the lengths of the sides of a triangle where one of the angles is 60 degrees.

Integer triangles with a 120° angle

Integer triangles with a 120° angle can be generated by

with coprime integers m, n with 0 < n < m (the angle of 120° is opposite to the side of length a). From here, all primitive solutions can be obtained by dividing a, b, and c by their greatest common divisor. The smallest solution, for m = 2 and n = 1, is the triangle with sides (3,5,7). See also.

More precisely, If , then , otherwise . Since the biggest side a can only be generated with a single  pair,  each primitive triple can be generated in precisely two ways: once directly with gcd = 1, and once indirectly with gcd = 3. Therefore, in order to generate all primitive triples uniquely, one can just add additional  condition.

Integer triangles with one angle equal to an arbitrary rational number times another angle

where  and p and q are any coprime integers such that .

Integer triangles with one angle equal to twice another

With angle A opposite side  and angle B opposite side , some triangles with B = 2A are generated by

with integers m, n such that 0 < n < m < 2n.

All triangles with B = 2A (whether integer or not) satisfy 

Integer triangles with one angle equal to 3/2 times another

with integers  such that , where  is the golden ratio .

Integer triangles with one angle three times another

We can generate the full equivalence class of similar triangles that satisfy B = 3A  by using the formulas

All triangles with B = 3A (whether with integer sides or not) satisfy 

Integer triangles with three rational angles

The only integer triangle with three rational angles (rational numbers of degrees, or equivalently rational fractions of a full turn) is the equilateral triangle. This is because integer sides imply three rational cosines by the law of cosines, and by Niven's theorem a rational cosine coincides with a rational angle if and only if the cosine equals 0, ±1/2, or ±1. The only ones of these giving an angle strictly between 0° and 180° are the cosine value 1/2 with the angle 60°, the cosine value –1/2 with the angle 120°, and the cosine value 0 with the angle 90°. The only combination of three of these, allowing multiple use of any of them and summing to 180°, is three 60° angles.

Integer triangles with integer ratio of circumradius to inradius

Conditions are known in terms of elliptic curves for an integer triangle to have an integer ratio N of the circumradius to the inradius.Goehl, John F. Jr., "More integer triangles with R/r = N", Forum Geometricorum 12, 2012: pp. 27−28 The smallest case, that of the equilateral triangle, has N = 2. In every known case, N ≡ 2 (mod 8)—that is, N – 2 is divisible by 8.

5-Con triangle pairs

A 5-Con triangle pair is a pair of triangles that are similar but not congruent and that share three angles and two sidelengths. Primitive integer 5-Con triangles, in which the four distinct integer sides (two sides each appearing in both triangles, and one other side in each triangle) share no prime factor, have triples of sides 

 and  

for positive coprime integers x and y. The smallest example is the pair (8, 12, 18), (12, 18, 27), generated by x = 2, y'' = 3.

Particular integer triangles

The only triangle with consecutive integers for sides and area has sides (3, 4, 5) and area 6.
The only triangle with consecutive integers for an altitude and the sides  has sides (13, 14, 15) and altitude from side 14 equal to 12.
The (2, 3, 4) triangle and its multiples are the only triangles with integer sides in arithmetic progression and having the complementary exterior angle property.  This property states that if angle C is obtuse and if a segment is dropped from B meeting perpendicularly AC extended at P, then ∠CAB=2∠CBP.
The (3, 4, 5) triangle and its multiples are the only integer right triangles having sides in arithmetic progression.
The (4, 5, 6) triangle and its multiples are the only triangles with one angle being twice another and having integer sides in arithmetic progression.
The (3, 5, 7) triangle and its multiples are the only triangles with a 120° angle and having integer sides in arithmetic progression.
The only integer triangle with area = semiperimeter has sides (3, 4, 5).
The only integer triangles with area = perimeter have sides (5, 12, 13), (6, 8, 10), (6, 25, 29), (7, 15, 20), and (9, 10, 17).  Of these the first two, but not the last three, are right triangles.
There exist integer triangles with three rational medians.  The smallest has sides (68, 85, 87).  Others include (127, 131, 158), (113, 243, 290), (145, 207, 328) and (327, 386, 409).
There are no isosceles Pythagorean triangles.
The only primitive Pythagorean triangles for which the square of the perimeter equals an integer multiple of the area are (3, 4, 5) with perimeter 12 and area 6 and with the ratio of perimeter squared to area being 24; (5, 12, 13) with perimeter 30 and area 30 and with the ratio of perimeter squared to area being 30; and (9, 40, 41) with perimeter 90 and area 180 and with the ratio of perimeter squared to area being 45.
There exists a unique (up to similitude) pair of a rational right triangle and a rational isosceles triangle which have the same perimeter and the same area. The unique pair consists of the (377, 135, 352) triangle and the (366, 366, 132) triangle.  There is no pair of such triangles if the triangles are also required to be primitive integral triangles. The authors stress the striking fact that the second assertion can be proved by an elementary argumentation (they do so in their appendix A), whilst the first assertion needs modern highly non-trivial mathematics.

See also

Robbins pentagon, a cyclic pentagon with integer sides and integer area
Euler brick, a cuboid with integer edges and integer face diagonals
Tetrahedron#Integer tetrahedra

References

Arithmetic problems of plane geometry
Discrete geometry
Squares in number theory
Types of triangles